Ioannis Demertzis was a Greek chieftain of the Macedonian Struggle from Serres.

Biography 
Ioannis Demertzis was born during the late 19th century in Serres. He established an armed group in order to fight against Bulgarian Komitadjis as well as the Ottoman authorities during the Macedonian Struggle. As the commander of the group, he fought in the areas of Serres, Darnakochoria and Lower Tzoumayia. He often collaborated with the chieftain Sophia Chatzipantazi.

References 

History of Serres
Greek people of the Macedonian Struggle
People from Serres
19th-century births

Year of birth uncertain
Year of death missing